Jessie Londas (born 12 January 1985 in Créteil) is a French former footballer who played as defender for Auxerre in the French Ligue 1.

See also
Football in France
List of football clubs in France

References

External links
Skynet

French footballers
1985 births
AJ Auxerre players
Ligue 1 players
Living people
US Créteil-Lusitanos players
Association football defenders